The 1952 Louisville Cardinals football team was an American football team that represented the University of Louisville as an independent during the 1952 college football season. In their seventh season under head coach Frank Camp, the Cardinals compiled a 3–5 record. Johnny Unitas was a player on the team.

Schedule

References

Louisville
Louisville Cardinals football seasons
Louisville Cardinals football